Fencing Ireland – formerly the Irish Fencing Federation (IFF) – is the governing body for the sport of fencing in Ireland.  It was formally established in 1936, although the sport of fencing has been practised in Ireland since the beginning of the 1900s. The Federation is recognised by Sport Ireland and the Olympic Council of Ireland, and it is also affiliated to the Federation Internationale d'Escrime and European Fencing Confederation.

Name
The organisation was established as the Irish Amateur Fencing Federation (IAFF) in 1936, and remained under that title until 2008 when it was reconstituted as the Irish Fencing Federation; the current trading name was adopted in March 2016, and later became the legal name of the organisation.

Role 
Fencing Ireland's stated aim is to promote, foster and develop the sport and art of fencing. In practice, its role includes approval of clubs via the affiliation system, management of the domestic competition calendar, certification and development of new coaches and referees, and selection of the national team for international tournaments.

As the national governing body, Fencing Ireland also takes responsibility for running two of the largest events in the Irish calendar: the National Championships and the Irish Open. In 2006, the Irish Open was designated an FIE Satellite World Cup for the Men's Épée discipline. The lure of world ranking points has brought some of the biggest names in international fencing to compete in Dublin.

History 
Fencing has been included in the Olympic Games since their modern-day inception in 1896 and the contemporary sport formally came to Ireland ten years later in 1906, when the Irish Fencing Club was founded in Dublin. It was not the first club in Ireland, but it was the first in which the principal aim was exercise and sport rather than duelling. The club closed in 1917, but was restarted again in 1933 following advertisements in Dublin newspapers. This was followed in 1934 by the Cork Fencing Club (renamed Club Palestrina in 1943) and the British Legion Fencing Club in 1935.

In 1936 the Irish Amateur Fencing Federation was set up as the governing body of the sport in Ireland and in revised form remains the sole governing body of the sport in the country today.

Clubs 

In the years following the establishment of the federation, clubs were set up at:
 Blackrock College
 Dublin University (1936, revived in 1940)
 The Royal College of Surgeons (1942)
 Kilkenny (1942)
 Limerick Fencing Club (1944)
 Shannon Fencing Club (1947)
 Salle d'Armes Duffy (1952)
 Cork County (1952)
 Clonmel (1954)
 UCD Fencing Club (1955)
 Pembroke Fencing Club, Dublin (2001)
 Salle Dublin (2005)
 Boyne Valley Fencing Club, Drogheda (2010)
 Fence Fit, Dublin (2011) - reopened as Ravenwood FC in Drimnagh
 Connaught Fencing Club, Tuam (2012)
 Blessington Fencing Club, Co. Wicklow (2012)
 Munster Blades (2013) in Nenagh, Limerick and Kilkenny
 Dundalk Fencing Club (2015)
 Brian Boru Fencing Academy, Abbotstown (2016)

Through the years the list of clubs has continued to grow steadily. Fencing clubs have been established in most major colleges in Ireland: in addition to Trinity College and UCD, clubs are also thriving at DCU,  UCC, NUI Galway, Maynooth University and until recently University of Limerick.  With the renewed focus on sport in Ireland's ITs, fencing has also taken off at DKIT, IT Carlow, and fencing has a foothold at IT Tallaght and University of Ulster. The early 21st century has seen an explosion in the number of private clubs appearing around the country, as well as clubs based within schools.

Competition
In 1948 Ireland sent its first fencers to the Olympics in  London.  Tom Smith, Harry Thuillier and Owen Tuohy competed in the individual foil event and were joined by Paddy Duffy for the team event.  Foilist Dorothy 'Tommy' Dermody was the first female fencer to represent Ireland at the Olympics.

References

National federations of the European Fencing Confederation
Fencing
1936 establishments in Ireland